"Venus" is a song written by Ed Marshall. The most successful and best-known recording of the track was by Frankie Avalon and released in 1959, when it reached the top of the Billboard Hot 100.

Background
"Venus" became Avalon's first number-one hit on the Billboard Hot 100 chart, and it spent five weeks atop the survey. The song also reached number ten on the R&B chart. The song's lyrics detail a man's plea to Venus, the Roman goddess of love and beauty, to send him a girl to love and one who will love him as well. Billboard ranked it as the No. 4 song for 1959.

The song was covered in the United Kingdom by Dickie Valentine, and it spent a week at number 20 in the Singles Chart in May 1959, the week before Frankie Avalon reached the Top 20 with his original version.

In 1976, Avalon released a new disco version of "Venus". That helped revive the singer's career, because it had been waning prior to its release, but it was Avalon's last Billboard Hot 100 hit. The re-recording of "Venus"  peaked at number forty-six on the U.S. Billboard Hot 100 and at number one on the Easy Listening chart. Avalon was quoted as saying of the remake: "It was all right, but I still prefer the original."

Other charting versions
Johnny Mathis: His version reached No. 23 on Billboards Easy Listening chart "bubbled under" the Billboard Hot 100 chart at No. 111.
Jamie Redfern: His version in 1973 entered the Go-Set - Australian charts at number 27.

In popular culture 
Avalon's recording of the song was used a number of times in the Showtime series Dexter, being the favourite song of Arthur Mitchell's sister Vera.

Charts

Weekly charts

All-time charts

See also
List of Hot 100 number-one singles of 1959 (U.S.)
List of number-one adult contemporary singles of 1976 (U.S.)

References

1959 singles
1976 singles
Barry Manilow songs
Frankie Avalon songs
Johnny Mathis songs
Billboard Hot 100 number-one singles
Cashbox number-one singles
Chancellor Records singles
1959 songs